Khojavend District is one of the 66 districts of Azerbaijan. It is located in the west of the country and belongs to the Karabakh Economic Region. The district borders the districts of Lachin, Shusha, Khojaly, Agdam, Aghjabadi, Fuzuli, Jabrayil, and Qubadli. Its capital and largest city is Khojavend, however since the city is under Russian peacekeeping control, the current de facto capital is the town of Hadrut. As of 2020, the district had a nominal population of 44,100.

History

Armenian control (1990s-2020)
Most of the area of the district was under the effective control of the self-declared Republic of Artsakh since the First Nagorno-Karabakh War from the early 1990s until late 2020, with the exception of the easternmost part, which remained under Azerbaijani control. Within Artsakh, its northeast half was administratively part of Martuni Province and the rest as part of Hadrut Province.

Return to Azerbaijani control
An armed conflict erupted between the Republic of Artsakh and Azerbaijan in late September 2020 which saw more parts of the district return to Azerbaijani control.

On October 9, 2020, it was announced that the city of Hadrut and eight villages (one of them is part of Khojavend district) had been recaptured by the Azerbaijani Army The town of Hadrut was subsequently declared as the provisional administrative centre of the district.

On October 14, 2020, the President of Azerbaijan announced that Bulutan, Malikjanli, Kamartuk, Taka and Taghaser villages of the district had been recaptured by the Azerbaijani Army.

On October 16, 2020, it was announced that Azerbaijan had taken control of three more villages in the district.

On October 20, 2020, the President of Azerbaijan announced the recapture of five more villages (Aghjakand, Mulkudara, Dashbashi, Gunashli (formerly known as Norashen), and Vang of the district from Armenian forces.

On October 23, 2020, it was announced that Azerbaijan recaptures villages of Dolanlar and Bünyadlı.

On November 7, 2020, it was announced that Azerbaijan had taken control of Ataqut and Tsakuri villages of the district along with 14 ones of Fuzuli, Jabrayil, Khojaly, Qubadli and Zangilan districts.

On November 9, 2020, the President of Azerbaijan announced the recapture of Susanlıq, Domi, Tuğ, Akaku, Azıx, Böyük Tağlar, Salakətin, Zoğalbulaq, Aragül, Tağavard, Böyük Tağavard, Zərdanaşen and Şəhər villages along with 58 villages of Fuzuli, Khojaly, Qubadli, Zangilan and Lachin districts

References

External links 

State Statistical Committee of Azerbaijan Republic. Population of Azerbaijan

 
Districts of Azerbaijan
Azerbaijani administrative divisions of Artsakh